Carlos Libedinsky is an Argentine musician, composer and, producer. Born in 1961, he is most renowned for his neo-tango project, Narcotango.

Before tango, Libedinsky transited through different genres, such as rock, pop, blues, medieval, and renaissance music. In 1992, he founded the duet Los Mareados, where he was also a composer.

Since 1986, he has been the director of Tademus, a music school in Buenos Aires.

As Narcotango, he made European tours in 2003, 2005, and 2007.

The Narcotango band consists of the following members:

Carlos Libedinsky, on bandoneón
Mariano Castro, on keyboard and samplers 
Marcelo Toth, on guitar
Fernando del Castillo, on drums/ percussion
Juan Pablo Maicas, on bass

Discography 
 Aldea Global (2001) - tango
 Narcotango (2003) - neo-tango
 Narcotango vol. 2 (2006) - neo-tango
 Narcotango en vivo (2008) 
 Limanueva (2010) 
 Cuenco (2013)

External links 
Carlos Libedinsky official homepage
 El Tangauta.com - August 2007 interview with Carlos Libedinsky in El Tangauta
 El Tangauta.com - October 2007 interview with Carlos Libedinsky in El Tangauta
Interview with Carlos Libedinsky on tangopulse.net

Tango musicians
Argentine musicians
Jewish Argentine musicians
Living people
Place of birth missing (living people)
1961 births